The 3rd West Virginia Cavalry Regiment was a cavalry regiment that served in the Union Army during the American Civil War. In 1864, the regiment had an important part in the Battle of Moorefield, where a surprise attack led by General William W. Averell routed Confederate cavalry.  The regiment also fought in the latter part of General Philip H. Sheridan's Valley Campaign, and was part of Capehart's Fighting Brigade in General George Armstrong Custer's Third Division. It was present at General Robert E. Lee's surrender of the Army of Northern Virginia at the Battle of Appomattox Court House.

Organization
The 3rd West Virginia Cavalry Regiment was organized in western Virginia in December, 1861, with the first company of the regiment organized and recruited in Morgantown. It was the first cavalry regiment raised by West Virginia under the Union government in Wheeling. David H. Strother was the regiment's original commander. He began as lieutenant colonel and later was promoted to colonel. However, he never commanded the regiment in the field. Instead, he spent time on the staffs of generals Nathaniel Banks, John Pope, George McClellan, Benjamin F. Kelley, David Hunter, and Franz Sigel. He resigned from the army after Hunter was replaced by Philip Sheridan.

Early action
Under Captain J.L. McGee, the regiment first reported to General B.F. Kelley at Grafton, where it was ordered to New Creek (Keyser), then on to take part in General Kelley's advance on Romney, where it charged Confederate breastworks. This charge was delivered with fine spirit and most satisfactory results, with the whole of the enemy's artillery, stores and flags being taken without casualties.

This advance was soon followed by the surprise of the Rebels at Blues Gap; resulting in the capture of a number of rebel prisoners, three pieces of artillery and the entire camp's supplies and munitions, driving them to the eastern slope of the Alleghenies and transferring the field of active operations to the Valley of Virginia. Captain McGee was promoted to Major of the 3rd West Virginia Cavalry on October 2, 1861.

In 1862, Company C, under Captain Conger, frequently engaged Confederate troops while in pursuit of “Stonewall” Jackson during his retreat up the Shenandoah Valley.

Everton Conger left the 3rd West Virginia Cavalry during September 1863 to join the 1st District of Columbia Cavalry Regiment as a major. After the assassination of President Abraham Lincoln, Everton Conger and the 16th New York Cavalry Regiment were involved with the capture of assassin John Wilkes Booth.

War's end
On April 2, 1864 at Ford's Station, under Lieutenant-Colonel John S. Witcher, the 3rd Cavalry charged and drove back a brigade of rebel cavalry, killing Confederate General Pegram. The regiment continued its duty, participating in the engagements at Appmattox Station and Court House, consequently present during Robert E. Lee's surrender on April 9.

Casualties
The 3rd West Virginia Cavalry suffered 6 officers and 40 enlisted men killed or mortally wounded in battle and 136 enlisted men dead from disease for a total of 182 fatalities.

Commanders
 Colonel David Hunter Strother

See also
West Virginia Units in the Civil War
West Virginia in the Civil War

Notes

Footnotes

Citations

References

External links
Sgt of Co D 3rd W V Cavalry
Petruzzi's history
History from Military Images

Units and formations of the Union Army from West Virginia
1861 establishments in Virginia
Military units and formations established in 1861
Military units and formations disestablished in 1865